Marie Felicity Angel (1923–2010) was a British illustrator and calligrapher known for her book illustrations.

Biography
Angel was born in London and educated at Coloma Convent Girls' School. Throughout World War II she attended the Croydon School of Arts and Crafts and after the war studied at the Royal College of Art design school until 1948. Her work as a freelance illustrator led to a commission from Harvard College Library to produce a number of illustrated bestiaries which in turn led to Angel working on a number of children's books, for both American and British publishers. She also wrote and illustrated books on the techniques of calligraphy and a volume of flower illustrations. Works by Angel have been shown at the Royal Academy in London and the Society of Designer Craftsmen and in solo exhibitions in America. Both the Victoria and Albert Museum in London and Harvard Library hold examples of her work. The Hunt Institute has a number of her botanical watercolours.

Books illustrated
 We Went Looking by Aileen Fisher, 1968, Crowell
 The Twenty-third Psalm, 1970 Crowell
 My Cat Has Eyes of Sapphire Blue by Aileen Fisher, 1973, Crowell
 Two Poems by Emily Dickinson
 The Tale of the Faithful Dove by Beatrix Potter, 1971, Warne
 The Tale of Tuppenny by Beatrix Potter, 1973, Warne
 Tucky the Hunter by J. Dickey, 1979, Crown.

Books written and illustrated
 The Art of Calligraphy, 1978, Robert Hale
 Bird, Beast and Flower, 1980, Chatto & Windus
 A Bestiary, 1964, Harvard College Library
 A New Bestiary, 1968, Harvard College Library
 An Animated Alphabet, Harvard College Library
 Painting for Calligraphy, 1984, Overlook Press
 An Alphabet of Garden Flowers, 1987, Pelham.

References

1923 births
2010 deaths
20th-century English painters
20th-century English women artists
20th-century English women writers
21st-century English painters
21st-century English women artists
21st-century English women writers
Artists from London
Alumni of Croydon College
Alumni of the Royal College of Art
English illustrators
English women painters
Women calligraphers